Rolandas Muraška (born March 13, 1973) is a retired Lithuanian professional tennis player and a former member of Lithuania Davis Cup team. He was the first Lithuanian who got ranked by ATP (July 26, 1993) and he was also the highest ranked Lithuanian for 259 weeks in total.

Career finals

Singles

Doubles

Davis Cup
Muraška holds the record of being a member of Lithuania Davis Cup team for the longest time period – 12 years – from the debut of Lithuania in Davis Cup competition in 1994 until his retirement in 2005. Also, he played most ties representing Lithuania (49) and he won the most singles (37) and the most doubles (19) matches in the history of Lithuanian team.

References

External links
 
 
 

1973 births
Living people
Lithuanian male tennis players
Sportspeople from Klaipėda